Sir Simon Fraser Campbell,  (born 27 March 1941) is a British chemist.

Early life and education
Campbell was born on 27 March 1941 in Lapal, England. He obtained a first-class BSc degree in Chemistry in 1962, a PhD degree in 1965, and an honorary DSc degree in 2004 from the University of Birmingham .

Career
He was President of the Royal Society of Chemistry from 2004 to 2006. He led innovative research, discovering some of the world's best-selling prescription drugs, including sildenafil, amlodipine, and doxazosin. He was visiting lecturer at Universidade de São Paulo. He was a medicinal chemist for Pfizer. He was visiting professor at University of Leeds, and on the advisory board of University of Kent, and University of Bristol.

Awards and honours
Campbell was knighted in the 2015 New Year Honours for services to chemistry, having previously been made a Commander of the Order of the British Empire (CBE).

References

1941 births
British chemists
Fellows of the Royal Society
Living people
Alumni of the University of Birmingham
Presidents of the Royal Society of Chemistry
Commanders of the Order of the British Empire
Knights Bachelor
Fellows of the Academy of Medical Sciences (United Kingdom)